The 1993 NCAA Division I Women's Tennis Championships were the 12th annual championships to determine the national champions of NCAA Division I women's singles, doubles, and team collegiate tennis in the United States, held from May 16–20, 1993 in Gainesville, Florida.

Host
This year's tournaments were hosted by the University of Florida at the Ring Tennis Complex in Gainesville, Florida. This was the third time the Gators hosted the women's championships (1989 and 1990).

The men's and women's NCAA tennis championships would not be held jointly until 2006.

Team tournament

See also
NCAA Division II Tennis Championships (Men, Women)
NCAA Division III Tennis Championships (Men, Women)

References

External links
List of NCAA Women's Tennis Champions

NCAA Division I tennis championships
NCAA Division I Women's Tennis Championships
NCAA Division I Women's Tennis Championships
NCAA Division I Women's Tennis Championships